Tanusree Chakraborty  (born 6 August 1984) is an Indian model turned actress in Bengali film and television.

Along with films, she has also worked on various television shows. Recently she has been hosting a beauty and lifestyle show called Sampurna on Zee Bangla channel. Tanusree Chakraborty joined the BJP in 2021, and contested for the party in the Shyampur seat in the 2021 West Bengal Legislative Assembly election but lost. She owns two restaurants in Kolkata.

Early life 
Chakraborty was born in Kolkata and was a student at Kamala Girls' High School. She later studied political science at Basanti Devi College, a University of Calcutta affiliate.

Career 
After finishing school, Chakraborty began to work as a model. At that time, she did not have a full idea of what modeling consisted of. She worked as a model for a short time and appeared in numerous advertisements, among which was a Bangladeshi commercial for Pran Powder Spice that was very popular in both Bengals. She came to prominence with the 2011 film Uro Chithi. She came into the limelight with performances in Bengali films such as Bedroom (2012), Obhishopto Nighty (2014), Window Connections (2014), Buno Haansh (2014) etc.

Filmography 

 Chirosakha Hey (2023)
 Revolver Rohoshyo (2023)
 Ravaan (2022)
 Tonic (2021)
 Nirbandhamer Jora Khun (2020)
 Antardhan (2020)
 Zombiesthaan (2019)
 Harano Prapti (2019)
 Gumnaami (2019)
 Flat No 609 (2018)
 Michael (2018)
 Chawlochitro Circus (2017)
 Samantaral (2017)
 Durga Sohay (2017)
 Colkatay Columbus (2016)
 Chorabali (2016)
 Cross Connection 2 (2015)
 Ichchhemotir Gappo (2015)
 Khaad (2014)
 Buno Haansh (2014)
 Window Connections (2014)
 Obhishopto Nighty (2014)
 Shunyo (Unreleased)
 Basanta Utsab (2013)
 Swabhoomi (2013)
 Chhoan (2012)
 Kayekti Meyer Golpo (2012)
 Bhalobasa Off Route (2012)
 Bedroom (2012)
 Uro Chithi (2011)
 Bondhu Eso Tumi (2010)

Reality Shows
 Didi No. 1 (2010) Zee Bangla Ebar Jalsha Rannaghore (2015) Star Jalsha''

See also 
 Ushasie Chakraborty

References

External links 
 
2011 Washington Bangla Radio (WBRi)—Interview: Actress Tanusree Chakraborty On Bengali Films Uro Chithi, Bhalobasha Off Route E, Bedroom & her Tollywood Experience 

Actresses in Bengali cinema
Actresses from Hyderabad, India
Actresses from Kolkata
Bengali female models
Bengali actresses
Living people
University of Calcutta alumni
21st-century Indian actresses
Female models from Kolkata
Bharatiya Janata Party politicians from West Bengal
1984 births